Dharampatni (English: Dutiful Wife) is an Indian drama television series that aired on Imagine TV. It was jointly produced by DJ's a Creative Unit and Endemol India. It premiered on 16 August 2011 and starred Harshad Chopda and Aasiya Kazi.

Plot

The story is about Mohan, who is sent abroad at a young age and returns after completing his studies. When he returns, he is completely changed, especially in the aspects of his behaviour and ideologies which are different from the others in his family, This change will make the character look grey. There are situations when his thought process counters his family, but the character is not completely grey. Later, because of his personal financial issues and family pressure, he marries a Gujrati girl Kastur, who is totally opposite of him in case of ideologies, traditions and culture. Mohan respects her, appreciates her and tries to fulfill his responsibilities towards her, However he doesn't love her yet but slowly as the time passes by, he understands her value as his wife and begins to develop feelings for her which turn into true love.

His wife, on the other hand, is very righteous towards him and always puts him first. She fulfills all her duties as his wife and cares for him immensely. She is a woman who will do anything for her husband's and family's well-being and happiness. Although he doesn't love her in the beginning, she is still very loyal and passionate about him and treats him like a god, and when she realizes that her husband has started to love her, she is expecting him to confess about it.

Saroj did not want her son Mohan, to marry her. Later on during the show, she starts to find out what a dutiful daughter-in-law Kastur is. The show portrays the story of Kastur and Mohan who are tied in the powerful bond of marriage and how they become each other's true soulmate.

Cast
 Harshad Chopda as Mohan Galla
 Aasiya Kazi as Kastur 
 Supriya Shukla as Saroj Galla
 Gopi Desai
 Mihika Verma
 Pankit Thakker
 Ekroop Bedi as Hansika
 Addite Shirwaikar as Mohan Galla 's sister

References

External links 
 Dharampatni on Colors TV

Imagine TV original programming
2011 Indian television series debuts
2012 Indian television series endings